Schreiteria is a genus of longhorn beetles of the subfamily Lamiinae, containing the following species:

 Schreiteria bruchi Melzer, 1933
 Schreiteria colombiana Monne & Monne, 2006

References

Parmenini
Cerambycidae genera